Bill Rabbit was an Oklahoma Native artist who experimented with various styles, painting as he felt rather than according to public expectations. Rabbit exhibited his art in numerous locations and won many awards over the period of his artistic career. In 1986, he was designated Master Artist by the Five Civilized Tribes Museum. Toward the end of his life, Rabbit began collaborating on paintings with his daughter Traci, in their mutual studio located in Pryor, OK. On April 9, 2012, Rabbit died.

Early life
Bill Rabbit was born in Casper, Wyoming on December 3, 1946 to parents Swimmer Dave Rabbit and Doris M.E.H Rabbit. He attended school in Casper, where he was the only Cherokee student in the school system. His talent showed early on in his kindergarten class. Rabbit sold his first watercolor in the fourth grade for $4, exhibiting his business savvy. Rabbit has no formal training in art apart from a two-week class in grade school. After high school, Rabbit was accepted to the Institute of American Indian Art in Santa Fe, New Mexico but enlisted in the army instead to serve in Vietnam. Following the war, Rabbit moved to his father's homestead allotment in Mazie, Oklahoma. In Maize, he made Southwestern jewelry with his welding skills. Later, Rabbit took up painting full time and he and his wife began to travel to booth shows and galleries across the country.

Style
Rabbit began painting as he felt rather than in a more traditional style according to what the public wanted. He was part of a wave of artists that broke from the older generation of native artists. Over time, Rabbit's subject matter has evolved from the realistic to the ethereal.

Exhibitions and awards
Rabbit's work is widely known and was exhibited in numerous locations, including:
Albuquerque Museum
Cherokee National Museum
Five Civilized Tribes Museum
Red Cloud Indian School Heritage Center Inc. Collection
Indian Arts & Crafts Association
Inter-Tribal Indian Ceremonials
John F. Kennedy Center for the performing Arts' Night of the First Americans
Paul VI Institute for the Arts' Let the Spirit Speak!
Museum of Natural History, the Native American Center for the Living Arts
Oklahoma Art Center Gallery's All-Oklahoma Indian Artists Invitational
Oklahoma Indian Art Program 
Oklahoma State Capitol
Prairie Fire Invitational Art show
Red Cloud Indian School - The Heritage Center's Red Cloud Indian Art show
Red Earth Festival
Southwestern International Round-up Tri-culture Art show
Trail of Tears State Park Gallery 
University of West Virginia

Bill's work is also featured in numerous public and private galleries.
Some of his greatest achievements include:
Named poster artist for the Inter-Tribal Indian Ceremonials (1984)
Designated a Master Artist by the Five civilized Tribes Museum (1986)
Poster artist for the Totah Festival (1988)
Artist of the Year & poster artist for the American Indian & Cowboy Artists National Western Art Exhibit (1989)
Named a Cherokee National Treasure

The Bill Rabbit Legacy Art Scholarship was created in Rabbit's honor by the Cherokee Nation Foundation.

References

External links
Oklahoma Native Artists Oral History Project -- OSU Library

1946 births
2012 deaths
Cherokee artists
Cherokee Nation artists
Native American painters
20th-century Native Americans
21st-century Native Americans